Johann Gottfried Schmeisser FRS FRSE (1767–1837) was an 18th/19th century German traveller, pharmacist and mineralogist.

Early years

He was born in Osterode near the Harz in Germany on 24 June 1767. He was apprenticed to Johann Ludwig Gosche as a pharmacist in Bockenem. He worked as a pharmacist in both Hamburg, Brunswick and Altona (where he befriended Baron Caspar Voght).

Career 
On the recommendation of Joseph Banks he went to London where he befriended the botanist James Edward Smith and the surgeon John Hunter. He began lecturing in pharmacy and mineralogy in London. His first stay in Britain was seven years, approximately 1786 to 1793. He made a briefer return as a traveling companion to Caspar Voght in 1794/95.

In 1794 he was elected a Fellow of the Royal Society of London, his proposer being Joseph Banks. In 1795 he was elected a Fellow of the Royal Society of Edinburgh during his tour of Scotland. His proposers were John Rotherham, Andrew Duncan, the elder, and William Wright. He was also a member of the Linnean Society.

He returned to the Altona region in 1796 to work as a pharmacist on the Baron's estate at Flottbek where the Baron built him a laboratory. Later in 1796 he accompanied the Baron's friend, Georg Sieveking on his trip to Paris, which was then still reeling from the French Revolution. In 1798 he accompanied Johann Georg Busch to the Harz in east Saxony, to Brunswick, Göttingen and Hanover.

Around 1822/23 he spent some time in Copenhagen. On his return he settled in Hamburg.

Death 
He died on 5 February 1837 in Hamburg.

Family

He was married to Louise Janette Texier, daughter of the diplomat Peter Texier. They had one son (Adolph) and two daughters (Louise Josephine Janette and Ida Charlotte).

Publications

Lament a poem dedicated to the late Prince Leopold of Brunswick (1785)
Mixed Poems and Essays (1785)
The Current State of Sciences in France (1787)
Syllabus of Lectures on Mineralogy (1794)
A System of Mineralogy (1794)

References

1767 births
1837 deaths
German mineralogists
Fellows of the Royal Society
Fellows of the Royal Society of Edinburgh